"The Gathering" is the sixth episode of the fifth season of the American animated television series Star Wars: The Clone Wars. It aired in the United States on November 3, 2012. The episode marks the first in the series' Young Jedi arc, the entirety of which was screened at the Star Wars Celebration VI convention on August 25, 2012. The episode follows six Jedi Younglings, guided by Ahsoka and Yoda, as they fulfill their rite of passage in constructing their own lightsabers, the main weapon used by the mystical Jedi. The episode also discusses the lightsaber's power source, Kyber crystals, which amplify the power of the Force.

Plot
 Padawan Ahsoka Tano and Jedi Master Yoda lead a group of Jedi Younglings on a trip to the planet Illum to complete their rite of passage in constructing their own lightsabers. The lightsabers use Kyber crystals as a power source, and the crystals must be gathered from caves on the planet. The two Jedi lead the Younglings to the cave entrance. The entryway is blocked by ice, but Yoda uses a crystal to focus sunlight on the ice and melt it, revealing an entrance. The Younglings are sent on their own into the caves to find their own Kyber crystals, and each Youngling has a flaw in their personality that they must overcome in order to escape the caves with their crystals before the entrance ices over again.

Production
The episode "The Gathering" and the rest of the episodes in the Young Jedi arc were originally shown at an 80-minute special presentation held at the Star Wars Celebration VI convention on August 25, 2012. Only adults who had brought children with them to the convention were allowed into the presentation.

Reception
Critics praised the episode's animation and imagery, as well as the introduction of the Young Jedi characters to the series (pictured at top right). IGN'''s Eric Goldman wrote, "From the devilish mouth around one crystal to the glowing center of the ice [one of the Younglings] traveled to, it was all amazing to look at." Bryan Young wrote that his favorite aspect of the episode was its exploration of Jedi mythology and compared the Youngling's rite of passage to the test Luke Skywalker was given inside the pit on Dagobah in the film The Empire Strikes Back. Jayson Peters of the East Valley Tribune wrote that he appreciated how similar the voice for Yoda in the episode sounded to the original voice-overs done by Frank Oz in Yoda's first appearance in film, The Empire Strikes Back.

Eric Goldman wrote in his review for IGN'' that the episode missed a major opportunity to explore the relationship between Ahsoka and Yoda: the two were left outside of the cave together while the Younglings completed their rite of passage, but the two Jedi's interactions during this time are not featured. Goldman also noted that with six new characters being introduced during the one 22 minute episode, only the very basic aspects of the Younglings' personalities were developed.

Further reading

References

External links
 
 

2012 American television episodes
Star Wars: The Clone Wars (2008 TV series) episodes